Primitive Cool is the second solo album by English singer Mick Jagger and was released in 1987. As the follow-up to Jagger's 1985 album She's the Boss, Primitive Cool was another attempt by Jagger to make him a solo star.

Background
Following the release of the Rolling Stones album Dirty Work in 1986, relations between Jagger and Keith Richards soured after Jagger decided to not tour to promote the album in favour of starting his second solo project. Richards was vocal about his discontent in the media—which Jagger replied to, also publicly; "Kow Tow" and "Shoot Off Your Mouth" were reportedly written in response to disparaging remarks made about Jagger by Keith Richards. Undeterred, Jagger promptly began work on Primitive Cool, recording in the Netherlands and Barbados.

Joining up with David A. Stewart and Keith Diamond in the producer's chair, Jagger used Jeff Beck as the regular guitarist for the sessions, seeking to have more uniformity in the recordings.

Reception

Released in September 1987 with "Let's Work" as the lead single, the commercial reaction to Primitive Cool was not as welcoming as the reception for She's the Boss, with the album merely reaching No. 26 in the UK and No. 41 in the United States with "Let's Work" and follow-ups singles "Throwaway" and "Say You Will" were minor hits, not at all rivalling "Just Another Night" in commercial success. As a result, although Jagger toured Primitive Cool, it was only in Japan and Australia, not feeling confident enough to attempt American or British shows.

Reissue
Although originally released by Columbia Records, Primitive Cool was acquired and reissued by Atlantic Records in 1993, following the release of Jagger's third album, Wandering Spirit, which was issued by Atlantic.

Track listing

Personnel
Mick Jagger – vocals, guitar, autoharp, harmonica, percussion
Phillip Ashley, Greg Phillinganes – keyboards
Jeff Beck - lead guitar
Jocelyn Brown, Craig Derry, Brenda White King, Pamela Quinlan, Cindy Mizelle, Harrison College Choir, Barbados – backing vocals
Richard Cottle, Patrick Seymour – keyboards
Keith Diamond, Olle Romo – programming
Bill Evans, David Sanborn – saxophone
Jon Faddis – trumpet
Dean Garcia, Doug Wimbish – bass guitar
Omar Hakim, Simon Phillips – drums
Seán Keane – fiddle
Paddy Moloney – whistle, Uillean pipes
Denzil Miller – keyboards, backing vocals
Vernon Reid, Jim Barber, Jimmy Rip, David A. Stewart – rhythm guitar
G. E. Smith – guitar

Production
Produced By Mick Jagger, David A. Stewart & Keith Diamond
Engineers: Jon Bavin, Manu Guiot, Bob Rosa, Ed Stasium
Assistant Engineers: Paul Hamingson, Michiel Hoogenboezem, Glen Johansen, Scott Mabuchi, Moira Marquis, Danny Mormando
Mixing: Michael Barbiero, Paul Hamingson, Ed Stasium, Steve Thompson
Digital Editing: Rhonda Schoen
Mastering: Greg Calbi
Christopher Austopchuk, Francesco Clemente - cover design

Charts

Weekly charts

Certifications and sales

References

External links
Miami Herald article

1987 albums
Albums produced by Mick Jagger
Albums produced by David A. Stewart
Atlantic Records albums
Columbia Records albums
Mick Jagger albums